Charles Jensen may refer to:

 Charles Jensen (gymnast) (1885–1920), Danish gymnast
 Charles Jensen (actor) (born 1969), American Actor
 Charles Jensen (poet) (born 1977), American poet and editor
 C. W. Jensen, retired police captain and commentator on the television series World's Wildest Police Videos
 Charles C. Jensen, namesake of the Jensen Botanical Gardens